Jon Jelacic (December 19, 1936 – September 17, 1993) was an American gridiron football player who played defensive lineman for five seasons for the New York Giants of the National Football League (NFL) and the Oakland Raiders of the American Football League (AFL). Jelacic also played two seasons with the Ottawa Rough Riders of the Canadian Football League (CFL), including their 1960 Grey Cup championship season.

Jelacic was born in Brainerd, Minnesota and played high school football, basketball and ran track.  He played college football as an end at the University of Minnesota and was captain of the 1957 Minnesota Golden Gophers football team.  Following his professional playing career in three leagues, Jelacic worked as a scout for the Atlanta Falcons and Green Bay Packers.  He died in his sleep in his lake cabin northeast of Bemidji, Minnesota, on September 17, 1993.

References

1936 births
1993 deaths
American football defensive linemen
American football ends
American Football League players
American players of Canadian football
Canadian football defensive linemen
Atlanta Falcons scouts
Green Bay Packers scouts
Minnesota Golden Gophers football players
New York Giants players
Ottawa Rough Riders players
Oakland Raiders players
People from Brainerd, Minnesota
Players of American football from Minnesota